Selangor F.C. II played the 2020 season in the Malaysia Premier League.

Review and events
16 December 2019, Michael Feichtenbeiner has been appointed as the club's head coach.

Quentin Cheng joined the club from Sutherland Sharks.

On 26 February 2020, the club announced several players from Mokhtar Dahari Academy has signed contract with the club.

On 4 July 2020, Football Association of Selangor announced Luqman Hakim set to join Belgian side K.V. Kortrijk.

In September 2020, Rusdi Suparman has been appointed as club's new head coach after Michael Feichtenbeiner has been redesignated as Selangor's head coach.

Competitions

Malaysia Premier League

League table

Statistics

Appearances and goals

|}

References

2020
Selangor II